Marilyn Brown may refer to:

 Marilyn Brown (actress) (1953–1997), American actress, sister of actors Barry and James Brown
 Marilyn Brown (author) (born 1938), American Mormon author
 Marilyn Brown Novel Award
 Marilyn A. Brown, Georgia Tech professor focusing on energy and climate change policy